Tororo District is a district in the Eastern Region of Uganda. The town of Tororo hosts the district headquarters.

Location
Tororo District is bordered by Mbale District to the north, Manafwa District to the north-east, Kenya to the east, Busia District to the south, Bugiri District to the south-west, and Butaleja District to the north-west.

Population
In 1991, the national population census estimated the population of the district at 285,300. The 2002 national census estimated the population at 379,400, with an annual population growth rate of approximately 2.7 percent. In 2012, the mid-year population was estimated at 487,900.

Economic activities
Agriculture is the backbone of the district economy. Most of the district produce is consumed locally or sold in the urban areas within the district. Crops grown include the following:

Notable people 
 Tezira Jamwa

References

External links
 Overview of Tororo District In 2013
 American Jewish World Service collaboration with UORDP
  Tororo District Homepage

 
Districts of Uganda
Eastern Region, Uganda